TVR Tuscan may refer to:

TVR Tuscan (1967), an English sports car produced from 1967 to 1971
TVR Tuscan Speed Six, produced from 1999 to 2006
TVR Tuscan Challenge, a one-make racing series dedicated to the TVR Tuscan Speed Six